Elizabeth Bower (born 1 August 1976) is an English actress, best known for starring as Dr Melody Bell in Doctors from 2007 to 2009.

Life and career
Bower was born in Leeds, West Yorkshire. Educated in Solihull, Bower attended Langley School, before undertaking A Levels in Theatre Studies, Geography and Biology at The Sixth Form College. After graduating from the University of Warwick with a BA hons in Theatre Studies and Performing Arts, Bower gained her post graduate diploma in Acting and Musical Theatre from the Mountview Academy of Theatre Arts.

After an initial period solely on stage, Bower took a supporting cast role in The Ralf Little Show in 2002 and occasional turns presenting Five kids slot Milkshake! Probably best known, until recently, for starring in commercials for the UK celebrity magazine Heat, in 2005 Bower starred in Channel 4's comedy sketch show Spoons, and then took a guest lead role in British crime drama Silent Witness episode "Cargo" as DCI Helen Radley.

After starring in the television adaptation of the children's book drama series The New Worst Witch, Bower won the Edinburgh Fringe Report award for Best Actress: TV Drama and Comedy 2006:

In 2007 to 2009 she starred as Dr Melody Bell for over 300 episodes in Doctors on BBC1
In 2011, she started to appear on the Sun Bingo adverts as the character 'Bubbles'.

In 2013, she played the role of Anna in the third series of Sky One sitcom Trollied.

From 2015, she has appeared in 'Moonpig' adverts on ITV

From 2016, she has appeared in 'GTech' adverts on multi TV channels.

From 2015, she has appeared on CBBC's Secret Life of Boys, playing the role of Aunt Corey.

From 2021, she has appeared in 'Aldi' advert on multi TV channels.

References

External links
 

1976 births
Living people
Actresses from Leeds
People from Solihull
Alumni of the University of Warwick
Alumni of the Mountview Academy of Theatre Arts
English stage actresses
English television actresses
English soap opera actresses